Zhang Jike (born 16 February 1988) is a retired Chinese table tennis player.

Zhang became the fourth male player in the history of table tennis to achieve a career Grand Slam when he won gold in men's singles at the Olympic games in London 2012. The first three are Jan-Ove Waldner (in 1992), Liu Guoliang (in 1999), and Kong Linghui (in 2000). Zhang won the Grand Slam in only 445 days. He won, consecutively, first WTTC 2011, then World Cup 2011, and then London Olympics 2012, which made him the fastest player ever to win a Grand Slam. After the first Grand Slam, he won WTTC 2013 and World Cup 2014.

Early life 
On February 16, 1988, Zhang was born in Qingdao, Shandong Province to Zhang Chuanming (张传铭) and Xu Xiying (徐锡英). His father is a table-tennis coach.
He was named after the Brazilian soccer coach Zico.

According to his father, the first time Zhang played table-tennis was on March 5, 1992, at age of 4.

Career
In 2011, Zhang first played in the singles event at the WTTC and won the gold medal by defeating Joo-Sae Hyuk, Wang Liqin, Timo Boll and Wang Hao, making an epic celebration by ripping his shirt after winning the final. After a few months, he won the 2011 World Cup in Paris by defeating Joo-Sae Hyuk 4–1, Wang Hao 4–2 in the final. After the final point, he took off his shirt and threw it to the audience and thanked them for their support. During the Olympic Games in London 2012, Zhang played a terrific match against European legend Vladimir Samsonov where he was 2-3 down, but still managed to win the match. In the semi-final, he defeated Dimitrij Ovtcharov 4–1. In the final he met his teammate Wang Hao again. But this time Zhang proved he was too strong and dominated Wang Hao. By defeating Wang Hao, he achieved a career Grand Slam. Zhang Jike also won the gold medal in the team event but on the way lost to Timo Boll in the semi-final against Germany. Later that year he won against Ma Long 4–3 in final of the Slovakia Open.

In 2013, he had a bad start after losing to Chen Chien-an at the Asian Games. Later at the WTTC, he once again proved he was undefeatable. He won the Gold Medal beating Fan Zhendong, Robert Gardos, Gustavo Tsuboi, Patrick Baum, Xu Xin and Wang Hao in the finals. This time Zhang jumped over the barriers and ran towards his parents. The same year, he defeated Ma Long 4–1 in the final of the Kuwait Open.

In 2014 he won the World Cup in Düsseldorf/Germany by defeating Timo Boll in the semi-final and Ma Long in the final by 4–3. He was appreciated for his amazing backhand-banana at 10-10 and took a service point to win the gold.

At the 2015 WTTC, he lost to Fang Bo 1–4, but partnering with Xu Xin he won the gold medal in the doubles event. In August, he was upset by Stefen Fegerl of Austria in the men's singles semi-final of the Polish Open. He lost to Ma Long 3–4 in the final of the German Open despite having a match point in the 6th game.

In 2016, Zhang Jike defeated Ma Long easily 4–1 in the final of the Kuwait Open.
During the Rio Olympics, Zhang defeated Koki Niwa in the quarter-final and Vladimir Samsonov in the semi-final. In the final he lost to his teammate Ma Long 0–4.

In 2017 at the Asian Championships Zhang defeated Yuya Oshima and Lin Gaoyuan before taking the bronze medal. At the WTTC in Düsseldorf/Germany, Zhang lost to Lee Sangsu of South-Korea 1–4. He could not play to his full potential as only the previous month he was under treatment for a hip injury. Next month in the China Open, he conceded his match versus Masaki Yoshida as he was again suffering from a hip injury. After 5 months being absent, Zhang appeared on the World Tour again. He participated in the German Open but lost to Tiago Apolonia 1–4. His world ranking dropped to 176 due to his absence from the World Tour. 6 months later he participated on the 2018 World Tour again. He first lost to Maharu Yoshimura, 3–4 in the Hong Kong Open as it was his first match after a long break from competitive play. Later that year at the China Open, he easily defeated Aruna Quadri but couldn't survive the speed of Tomokazu Harimoto. At the Japan Open, he was back in form again and defeated Lin Yun-ju, Jonathan Groth, Liang Jiangkun and Jin Ueda. But unfortunately he injured his back while playing against Harimoto in the final and lost 3–4 in a narrow match. His ranking however increased to number 71 in just one month. Two months later at the Asia-Euro Championships he defeated Bastian Steger and Jonathan Groth and proved he is still in form.

Equipment and playing style
Zhang Jike is a Butterfly sponsored athlete. He uses Butterfly Viscaria for his blade, a Butterfly Tenergy 80 (red) on his backhand, and DHS Hurricane 3 neo National blue sponge (black) on his forehand.

Zhang Jike is a two-winged shakehand attacker, using a combination of quick topspin drive attacks, counters, and loops. He is using the harder blue sponge H3 Neo for maximum drive. He stays very low to the ground and is exceptionally quick on his feet. Among all the Chinese National team players, he is known for having the best backhand technique, often using it in the forehand corner, especially when returning heavy under-spin serves and pushes. His backhand on-the-table flick is widely regarded as one of the best in the world.

When Zhang Jike initially joined the national team, the coaches were apprehensive about his forehand technique and thought about changing it completely. But Xiao Zhan, the then personal coach of Zhang Jike, noticed the explosive technique of his forehand and backhand strokes and instead retained them. Zhang Jike's spin oriented technique provides him oftentimes with a topspin advantage against opponents.

Zhang's serves are unpredictable and quite deceptive. His most famous serve is probably the reverse-pendulum short serve into both corners of the table. The side-spin on the serve, together with his backhand flicks, above-average footwork and top-class anticipation has proved to be an ideal combination as he is capable to "open up" topspin rallies to his advantage.

It is noticeable that he would play with a backhand oriented game plan against big forehand loopers like Ma Long or Fan Zhendong. He would keep his opponents in their backhand corner and go for down-the-line blocking winners as the opposition steps around to use a forehand loop, or just pile up pressure, resulting in bad shot selections and unforced errors by the opponent.

One of Zhang Jike's most valuable asset is his mental strength. His ability to win big points in major competitions under pressure is apparent to observers.

In 2014, Zhang's world ranking dropped to 5th as a result of consecutive early world tour exits and title drought. Head coach Liu Guoliang criticized him for his lack of focus and techniques development. However, Zhang managed to lead his hometown team, Shandong, to the 2014 Chinese Table Tennis Super League championship, and he won the World Cup again in October. His prize money, US$45,000, for winning the World Cup was taken as a fine as himself proposed for destroying the barriers in celebration. This fund will be used to set up Fair Play Award.

Career records
Singles (as of May 1, 2019)
 Olympic Games: Winner (2012); Runner-up (2016).
 World Championships: Winner (2011, 13).
 World Cup: Winner (2011, 14); Runner-up (2010).
 Pro Tour Winner (6): China Open, Suzhou (2010); German Open (2011); Korean Open (2012), Slovenian Open (2012), Kuwait Open (2013).Kuwait open(2016) Runner-up (4): Qatar Open (2010); China Open, Suzhou (2011); Austrian Open (2011); Japan Open(2018)
 Pro Tour Grand Finals: Runner-up (2011); SF (2009).
 Asian Championships: Runner-up (2009, 12).
 Asian Cup: Winner (2010).
Men's doubles
 World Championships: Winner (2015).
 Pro Tour winner (6): Kuwait Open 2010; Slovenian, English, UAE, German, China (Suzhou) Open 2011. Runner-up (7): Kuwait, Qatar Open 2008; China (Suzhou) Open 2009; German Open 2010; Qatar, China (Shenzen), Austrian Open 2011.
 Pro Tour Grand Finals: Winner (2011).
 Asian Games: Winner (2010, 14).

Mixed Doubles
 World Championships: Runner-up (2009).
 Asian Games: QF (2010).
 Asian Championships: Runner-up (2009).

References

External links
 
 
 
 
 
 
 Zhang Jike at Table Tennis Guide
Zhang Jike at Table Tennis Media

Living people
1988 births
Chinese male table tennis players
Olympic table tennis players of China
Table tennis players at the 2012 Summer Olympics
Table tennis players at the 2016 Summer Olympics
Olympic gold medalists for China
2016 Olympic gold medalists for China
2016 Olympic silver medalists for China
Olympic medalists in table tennis
Medalists at the 2012 Summer Olympics
Table tennis players at the 2010 Asian Games
Table tennis players at the 2014 Asian Games
Asian Games medalists in table tennis
Asian Games gold medalists for China
Table tennis players from Qingdao
Medalists at the 2010 Asian Games
Medalists at the 2014 Asian Games
World Table Tennis Championships medalists
The Amazing Race contestants